Fearless is the fifth album by the British progressive rock band Family, which was released on 29 October 1971, on Reprise Records in the UK and United Artists Records in the US. It is known for its innovative cover design by John Kosh, using layered-page album headshots of the band's members melding into a single blur.

Background

After completing their second US tour in mid 1971, John Weider left the band and was replaced by John Wetton on bass and vocals. The band's direction was notably changed with Wetton bringing along his trademark propulsive performance style, as evidenced on the album opener "Between Blue and Me". After only a year and one more album, Wetton left to join the latest line-up of King Crimson and was replaced by Jim Cregan. Fearless was the first Family album to chart in the United States, reaching #177 on the Billboard 200 in March 1972, and staying on the charts for 7 weeks.

Reception

Writing in the US rock magazine Creem, reviewer Ed Ward, after admitting that he hadn't liked Family, called Fearless "a good, strong album, loaded with some of the most intense, high energy British rock and roll being made these days", but still rated it "not quite as good as Anyway" (which hadn't been released in the United States at that time, anyway). He dismissed tracks "Spanish Tide" and "Children" as "filler", but concluded that "what's left is fine indeed."

Jack Breschard, writing in Crawdaddy, went further and declared the album to be "nothing less than brilliant." He singled out Side One for particular praise, "being the catchiest album side I've heard in a very long time." He thought that much of the album's strength lay in "the multi-instrumentality of the band", adding that although the band's range was wide "no-one gets hung up in a bunch of musical pretensions."

AllMusic deemed the album "uneven", but noted that it had some strong highlights, such as "Spanish Tide", "Save Some for Thee", and "Take Your Partners", the last of which saw "the bandmembers maneuver their interaction with an aptitude and skill that would arguably best any jam-based aggregate of the day."

Track listing

All selections are by Roger Chapman and Charlie Whitney except where noted.

Personnel

Family
 Roger Chapman – lead vocals, guitars, percussion
 Charlie Whitney – guitars, mandolin, percussion
 John "Poli" Palmer – keyboards, backing vocals, vibes, flute, percussion
 John Wetton – bass, backing vocals, guitars, contracts, keyboards
 Rob Townsend – drums, paiste cymbals, percussion

Additional musicians
 The Ladbroke Horns – brass

Technical
 Family – producer
 George Chkiantz – producer

Chart positions

Highest chart position (UK) - #14
Highest chart position (USA) - #177 (Billboard)*

(*This was Family's first appearance on the Billboard charts in the U.S.)

References

External links
 Family Bandstand
 

1971 albums
Family (band) albums
Reprise Records albums
Albums produced by George Chkiantz
Albums produced by Roger Chapman
Albums produced by John "Charlie" Whitney
Albums produced by John Palmer (musician)
Albums produced by Rob Townsend
Albums produced by John Wetton
United Artists Records albums